Retrato de Mujer is the sixth studio album of Puerto Rican singer Ednita Nazario. It was released in 1979. This studio album is notable for the song "Cadenas de fuego", one of the most popular songs in the album. With that song, Nazario competed in the eight edition of the OTI Festival in Caracas getting the fifth place with 21 points.

Track listing
 "En Mi Mente...En Mi Cuerpo"
 "No Me Dejes...No"
 "Cuando Tu Me Querías"
 "Retrato De Mujer"
 "Cadenas De Fuego"
 "A Donde Fueron Los Sueños"
 "Enamorada De Tí"
 "Dame Más De Tí"
 "Tómame"
 "You're All I Have"

Personnel
 Produced by Laureano Brizuela

Ednita Nazario albums
1979 albums